The Bats were a South African band formed in Johannesburg in 1963. Their 1966 single "Listen to My Heart" was a hit on the Radio London charts.

History
The band is composed of Barry Jarman - guitar, trumpet, assorted instruments; Jimmy Dunning - guitar, replaced by Pete Clifford - guitar, vocals; Paul Ditchfield - bass, guitar, keyboards, vocals; and drummer Eddie Eckstein.

The Bats re-formed in 2000. Barry Jarman was approached, but said, "Been there, done that," and declined. Unfortunately, Barry later passed on. Derek Gordon took Barry's place in the line-up, and continues to serve in the group. Although the Bats are now not in the mould of high end entertainers, they continue to "wow" audiences with their 1960s and 1970s music. Their music and comedy presentations are still polished shows, fit for Pieter Toerien's Monte Casino Theatre in Fourways, Gauteng, South Africa.

Discography

Albums

Singles

Compilations

References

External links
http://rock.co.za/files/bats_index.html

1963 establishments in South Africa
Musical groups established in 1963
Beat groups
South African musical groups
CBS Records artists